Music Row is a cover album by Jill Johnson, recorded in Nashville and released on 28 November 2007. The album sold platinum in Sweden and peaked at number three on the Swedish Albums Chart.

Track listing
Rhythm Guitar - 3.20
Jolene - 3.30
Why'd You Come in Here Lookin' Like That (duet with Nina Persson) - 2.41
Angel of the Morning - 3.56
Papa Come Quick - 3.09
Mama He's Crazy - 3.21
Tumbling Dice (duet with Kim Carnes) - 3.37
You're No Good - 3.43
Why Not Me - 4.04
Life in the Fast Lane - 4.37
You Don't Have to Say You Love Me (Io che non vivo senza te) - 4.14
Need Your Love So Bad - 4.31
To Know Him Is to Love Him (duet with Lisa Miskovsky) - 3.56
Angel from Montgomery - 6.07

Charts

References

External links

2007 albums
Covers albums
Jill Johnson albums